A scowl is another word for frown.

Scowl may also refer to:

Characters
 Scowl (Transformers), one of the Monster Pretenders in the Transformers universe
 Scowl, name of an owl in the 1989 film Happily Ever After

Music
 "Scowl", 2015 song by The Story So Far from The Story So Far

See also
 Scowle, a hollow in the ground
 Unicode U+2322 (⌢) FROWN, see Miscellaneous Technical (Unicode block)